Edward Baranoski, from Intelligence Advanced Research Projects Activity (IARPA), McLean, VA, was named Fellow of the Institute of Electrical and Electronics Engineers (IEEE) in 2016 for leadership in knowledge-aided radar systems for indoor environments.

References 

Fellow Members of the IEEE
Living people
MIT Lincoln Laboratory people
Year of birth missing (living people)
Place of birth missing (living people)
American electrical engineers